HKIS may refer to:

 The Hong Kong Institute of Surveyors
 Hong Kong International School
 Ichthyological Society of Hong Kong
 Isiolo Airport, in Kenya

See also
 HKI (disambiguation), for the singular of "HKIs"